The 1983 British Speedway Championship was the 23rd edition of the British Speedway Championship. The Final took place on 1 June at Brandon in Coventry, England. The Championship was won by Chris Morton, with Michael Lee second and Andy Grahame winning a run-off against Kenny Carter, Peter Collins and John Davis for third.

Final 
1 June 1983
 Brandon Stadium, Coventry

See also 
 British Speedway Championship
 1983 Individual Speedway World Championship

References 

British Speedway Championship
Great Britain